Below is a list of events in chess in 1994, as well as the top ten FIDE rated chess players of that year.

Top players

FIDE top 10 by Elo rating – January 1994

 Garry Kasparov  2815
 Anatoly Karpov  2740
 Alexei Shirov  2715
 Viswanathan Anand  2715
 Vassily Ivanchuk  2710
 Vladimir Kramnik  2710
 Gata Kamsky  2695
 Valery Salov  2685
 Evgeny Bareev  2685
 Boris Gelfand  2685

Chess news in brief

The PCA and sponsor Intel team up for a series of knockout 'Grand Prix' events. These rapidplay events are considered more media and spectator friendly than chess played at regular time limits. The prizes are generous and the world's elite players turn out in force. Viswanathan Anand wins the Moscow Grand Prix, Vladimir Kramnik the New York City event and Vassily Ivanchuk is a winner in London. Garry Kasparov, after coming close at New York, wins the Paris edition. Intel's new Pentium processor is used to run the Chess Genius program at the London event and the computer defeats Kasparov, but fares less well against Anand.
The semi-final stage of the PCA World Chess Championship produces two finalists in Anand and Gata Kamsky, when they defeat Michael Adams and Nigel Short respectively.
In FIDE's equivalent contest, the (Wijk aan Zee) Candidates' quarter-final winners are Anand (over Artur Yusupov), Kamsky (over Paul van der Sterren), Kramnik (over Leonid Yudasin), Jan Timman (over Joël Lautier), Valery Salov (over Alexander Khalifman) and Boris Gelfand (over Adams). Subsequently, in the (Sanghi Nagar) semi-finals, Gelfand eliminates Kramnik, Kamsky eliminates Anand and Salov eliminates Timman. All three join Anatoly Karpov in the final stages.
The Chess Olympiad is switched to Moscow, after problems are encountered with the planned venue of Thessaloniki. First place goes to Russia (37½/56), ahead of Bosnia & Herzegovina (35), Russia II and England (both 34½). 124 teams take part. Georgia wins the Women's event (32/42), ahead of Hungary (31), China and Romania (both 27). Yuri Averbakh is the Chief Arbiter for both events.
Karpov wins at Linares. An immensely strong entry results in FIDE's first ever Category 18 classification.
Kasparov and Ivanchuk share success at the double round Novgorod tournament with 7/10 ahead of Kramnik (5).
Kasparov wins the Amsterdam double rounder with 4/6.
Kamsky is the winner at Las Palmas with 6½/9, ahead of Karpov (6).
The Horgen tournament is a runaway success for Kasparov with 8½/11.
Jeroen Piket wins at the Dortmund Sparkassen Tournament with 6½/9, ahead of Adams (5½).
Munich is a triumph for Ivanchuk with 7½/11.
Gelfand is the victor at Dos Hermanas with 6½/9, ahead of Karpov on 6.
Judit Polgár wins at Madrid with 7/9.
Salov is the winner of a knockout event in Tilburg.
Alexander Morozevich wins the final Lloyds Bank, London event with an almost perfect 9½/10.
John Nunn wins the 1993/94 Hastings International Chess Congress.
A double Estonian success occurs at the 12th New York City Open when Lembit Oll and Jaan Ehlvest share victory.
The Armenian GM Artashes Minasian wins the World Open.
Icelander Helgi Grétarsson wins the World Junior Chess Championship in Brazil, and becomes a chess grandmaster as a result.
The World Youth Chess Championships are held in Szeged, Hungary.  A stronger than average entry reveals many exceptional talents, including winners Peter Svidler (Under 18), Peter Leko (Under 16), Levon Aronian (Under 12) and Natalia Zhukova (Under 16 girls). Svidler crowns a special year by also winning the Russian Chess Championship.
Boris Gulko wins the U.S. Chess Championship in Key West, Florida. He takes home an $8,000 prize for first place.
Mark Taimanov wins the 4th World Senior Championship at Biel.
Georgi Orlov wins the 95th U.S. Open Chess Championship in Chicago.
Josh Waitzkin wins the U.S. Junior Championship in Bloomington.
Joel Benjamin wins the 5th Harvard Cup, but the computer program Wchess outperforms the Grandmasters.
Peter Leko becomes a Grandmaster at 14 years, 4 months, 22 days.
Valery Salov wins a 'double round' themed tournament in Buenos Aires. Themed tournaments at the top level are nowadays rare; in this one, every game commences with an Open Sicilian.
Alexei Shirov is married for the first time (to the Argentinian, Veronica Alvarez) and moves to Tarragona, Spain, where he settles and takes citizenship.

Births

Hou Yifan, World Girls' Under-10 Champion (2003) and Chinese Women's champion (2007) at 13 years.
Srinath Narayanan, Indian prodigy, World Under-12 Champion in 2005.
Ray Robson, USA's youngest ever IM-elect.

Deaths

Olga Rubtsova, former Women's World Chess Champion – December 13
Vladimir Zagorovsky, former World Correspondence Champion and Champion of Moscow – November 6
Igor Platonov, Ukrainian-Soviet Grandmaster – November 13
Gyula Kluger, Hungarian International Master – September 23
Theo van Scheltinga, Dutch International Master – July 30
Triantafyllos Siaperas, Greek International Master, twice the national champion – February 25

References

Chess History & Chronology - Bill Wall(  2009-10-20)
Olimpbase - Olympiads and other Team event information
FIDE rating list data 1970-97

 
20th century in chess
Chess by year